Events from the year 1805 in Canada.

Incumbents
Monarch: George III

Federal government
Parliament of Lower Canada: 4th (starting January 9)
Parliament of Upper Canada: 4th (starting February 1)

Governors
Governor of the Canadas: Robert Milnes
Governor of New Brunswick: Thomas Carleton
Governor of Nova Scotia: John Wentworth
Commodore-Governor of Newfoundland: Erasmus Gower
Governor of Prince Edward Island: Joseph Frederick Wallet DesBarres

Events
 January 29 – 4th Parliament of Lower Canada session starts, ends April 27, 1808
 February 1 – 4th Parliament of Upper Canada session starts, ends May 21, 1808
 100th Regiment of Foot (Prince Regent's County of Dublin Regiment) arrives in Nova Scotia
 Vermont passes an act to establish the line between it and Canada.

Births
 February 16 – Edmund Walker Head, Governor General (d.1868) 
 August 26 – Joseph-Bruno Guigues, first bishop of the diocese of Bytown (Ottawa) (d.1874)
 December 8 – Amand Landry, farmer and politician (d.1877)

Full date unknown
 John Kent, Premier of Newfoundland (d.1872)

Deaths
 March 23 – Richard Dobie, an early Canadian businessman and a sometimes partner of Benjamin Frobisher (born 1731)

References 

 
Canada
05
1805 in North America